Speyeria clara is a species of fritillary butterfly of the family Nymphalidae. It has an eastern range in the Palearctic realm – the Himalayas, Tibet, Kashmir, Sikkim. Speyeria clara  was first described by Émile Blanchard in 1844.

References 

Speyeria
Butterflies described in 1844